Amir Hussin Hamsain (born 8 July 1942) is a Filipino former swimmer. He competed in the men's 200 metre butterfly at the 1960 Summer Olympics.

References

1942 births
Living people
Filipino male swimmers
Olympic swimmers of the Philippines
Swimmers at the 1960 Summer Olympics
People from Sulu
Asian Games medalists in swimming
Asian Games silver medalists for the Philippines
Asian Games bronze medalists for the Philippines
Swimmers at the 1962 Asian Games
Medalists at the 1962 Asian Games
Male butterfly swimmers
20th-century Filipino people
21st-century Filipino people